The Capetian dynasty, also known as the House of France, is a dynasty of Frankish origin, and a branch of the Robertians. It is among the largest and oldest royal houses in Europe and the world, and consists of Hugh Capet, the founder of the dynasty, and his male-line descendants, who ruled in France without interruption from 987 to 1792, and again from 1814 to 1848. The senior line ruled in France as the House of Capet from the election of Hugh Capet in 987 until the death of Charles IV in 1328. That line was succeeded by cadet branches, the Houses of Valois and then Bourbon, which ruled without interruption until the French Revolution abolished the monarchy in 1792. The Bourbons were restored in 1814 in the aftermath of Napoleon's defeat, but had to vacate the throne again in 1830 in favor of the last Capetian monarch of France, Louis Philippe I, who belonged to the House of Orléans.
Cadet branches of the Capetian House of Bourbon house are still reigning over Spain and Luxembourg.

The dynasty had a crucial role in the formation of the French state. Initially obeyed only in their own demesne, the Île-de-France, the Capetian kings slowly but steadily increased their power and influence until it grew to cover the entirety of their realm. For a detailed narration on the growth of French royal power, see Crown lands of France.

Members of the dynasty were traditionally Catholic, and the early Capetians had an alliance with the Church. The French were also the most active participants in the Crusades, culminating in a series of five Crusader kings – Louis VII, Philip Augustus, Louis VIII, Louis IX, and Philip III. The Capetian alliance with the papacy suffered a severe blow after the disaster of the Aragonese Crusade. Philip III's son and successor, Philip IV, humiliated Pope Boniface VIII and brought the papacy under French control. The later Valois, starting with Francis I, ignored religious differences and allied with the Ottoman sultan to counter the growing power of the Holy Roman Empire. Henry IV was a Protestant at the time of his accession, but realized the necessity of conversion after four years of religious warfare.

The Capetians generally enjoyed a harmonious family relationship. By tradition, younger sons and brothers of the king of France were given appanages for them to maintain their rank and to dissuade them from claiming the French crown itself. When Capetian cadets did aspire for kingship, their ambitions were directed not at the French throne, but at foreign thrones. As a result, the Capetians have reigned at different times in the kingdoms of Spain, Poland, Aragon, Portugal, Navarre, and as emperors of the Brazilian and Latin empires.

In modern times, King Felipe VI of Spain is a member of this family, while Grand Duke Henri of Luxembourg is related to the family by agnatic kinship; both through the Bourbon branch of the dynasty. Along with the House of Habsburg, arguably its greatest historic rival, it was one of the two oldest European royal dynasties. It was also one of the most powerful royal families in European history, having played a pre-eminent role in its politics for much of its existence.

Name origins and usage 
The name of the dynasty derives from its founder, Hugh, who was known as "Hugh Capet". The meaning of "Capet" (a nickname rather than a surname of the modern sort) is unknown. While folk etymology identifies it with "cape", other suggestions indicate it might be connected to the Latin word caput ("head"), and explain it as meaning "chief" or "head".

Historians in the 19th century (see House of France) came to apply the name "Capetian" to both the ruling house of France and to the wider-spread male-line descendants of Hugh Capet. It was not a contemporary practice. The name "Capet" has also been used as a surname for French royalty, particularly but not exclusively those of the House of Capet. One notable use was during the French Revolution, when the dethroned King Louis XVI (a member of the House of Bourbon and a direct male-line descendant of Hugh Capet) and Queen Marie Antoinette (a member of the House of Habsburg-Lorraine) were referred to as "Louis and Antoinette Capet" (the queen being addressed as "the Widow Capet" after the execution of her husband).

Capetian miracle
 
The Capetian Miracle refers to the dynasty's ability to attain and hold onto the French crown.

In 987, Hugh Capet was elected to succeed Louis V of the Carolingian dynasty that had ruled France for over three centuries. By a process of associating elder sons with them in the kingship, the early Capetians established the hereditary succession in their family and transformed a theoretically electoral kingship into a sacral one. By the time of Philip II Augustus, who became king in 1180, the Capetian hold on power was so strong that the practice of associate kingship was dropped. While the Capetian monarchy began as one of the weakest in Europe, drastically eclipsed by the new Anglo-Norman realm in England (who, as dukes of Normandy, were technically their vassals) and even other great lords of France, the political value of orderly succession in the Middle Ages cannot be overstated. The orderly succession of power from father to son over such a long period of time meant that the French monarchs, who originally were essentially just the direct rulers of the Île-de-France, were able to preserve and extend their power, while over the course of centuries the great peers of the realm would eventually lose their power in one succession crisis or another.

By comparison, the Crusader Kingdom of Jerusalem was constantly beset with internal succession disputes because each generation only produced female heirs who tended to die young. Even the English monarchy encountered severe succession crises, such as The Anarchy of the 1120s between Stephen and Matilda, and the murder of Arthur I, Duke of Brittany, the primogeniture heir of Richard I of England. The latter case would deal a severe blow to the prestige of King John, leading to the eventual destruction of Angevin hegemony in France. In contrast, the French kings were able to maintain uncontested father-to-son succession from the time of Hugh Capet until the succession crisis which began the Hundred Years' War of the 14th century.

The Robertians and before 

The dynastic surname now used to describe Hugh Capet's family prior to his election as King of France is "Robertians" or "Robertines." The name is derived from the family's first certain ancestor, Robert the Strong (b. 820), the count of Paris. Robert was probably son of Robert III of Worms (b. 800) and grandson of Robert of Hesbaye (b. 770). The Robertians probably originated in the county Hesbaye, around Tongeren in modern-day Belgium. The sons of Robert the Strong were Odo and Robert, who both ruled as king of Western Francia. The family became Counts of Paris under Odo and Dukes of the Franks under Robert, possessing large parts of Neustria.

In the late 9th century, King Robert I, grandfather of Hugh Capet, married Beatrice of Vermandois, a direct descendent of Charlemagne, thus making the Capetian dynasty a cadet branch of the Carolingian dynasty.

The Carolingian dynasty ceased to rule France upon the death of Louis V. After the death of Louis V, the son of Hugh the Great, Hugh Capet, was elected by the nobility as king of France. Hugh was crowned at Noyon on 3 July 987 with the full support from Holy Roman Emperor Otto III. With Hugh's coronation, a new era began for France, and his descendants came to be named the Capetians, with the Capetian dynasty and its cadet branches such as the House of Valois ruling France for more than 800 years (987–1848, with some interruptions.

Robertian family branches 
Rodbert
Ingerman of Hesbaye
Ermengarde of Hesbaye, wife of Louis the Pious
Cancor, founder of the Lorsch Abbey
Heimrich (−795), count in the Lahngau
Poppo of Grapfeld (−839/41), ancestor of the Frankish House of Babenberg
Landrada
Saint Chrodogang, Archbishop of Metz, Abbot of the Lorsch Abbey
Robert of Hesbaye
Robert III of Worms
Robert the Strong
Odo, king of Western Francia
Richildis, married to a count of Troyes
Robert, king of Western Francia
Emma, married Rudolph of Burgundy
Adela, married Herbert II, Count of Vermandois
Hugh the Great
Hugh Capet, founder House of Capet
Hadwig, married Reginar IV, Count of Mons
Robert II
Otto-Henry
Odo
Beatrix, married Frederick of Bar
Emma, married Richard I of Normandy
Herbert, bishop of Auxerre

Capetians through history 

Over the succeeding centuries, Capetians spread throughout Europe, ruling every form of provincial unit from kingdoms to manors.

Salic law 
Salic law, reestablished during the Hundred Years' War from an ancient Frankish tradition, caused the French monarchy to permit only male (agnatic) descendants of Hugh to succeed to the throne of France.

Without Salic law, upon the death of John I, the crown would have passed to his half-sister, Joan (later Joan II of Navarre). However, Joan's paternity was suspect due to her mother's adultery in the Tour de Nesle Affair; the French magnates adopted Salic law to avoid the succession of a possible bastard.

In 1328, King Charles IV of France died without male heirs, as his brothers did before him. Philip of Valois, the late king's first cousin acted as regent, pending the birth of the king's posthumous child, which proved to be a girl. Isabella of France, sister of Charles IV, claimed the throne for her son, Edward III of England. The English king did not find support among the French lords, who made Philip of Valois their king. From then on the French succession not only excluded females but also rejected claims based on the female line of descent.

Thus the French crown passed from the House of Capet after the death of Charles IV to Philip VI of France of the House of Valois, a cadet branch of the Capetian dynasty,
then to Louis II, Duke of Orléans, of the Orléans branch of the Valois, who became Louis XII of France,
then to Francis, Duke of Valois, Count of Angoulème, who became Francis I of France, and his descendants, of the Orléans-Angoulème,
then to Henry III of Navarre, who became Henry IV of France, of the House of Bourbon, a cadet branch of the Capetian dynasty.

This did not affect monarchies not under that law such as Portugal, Spain, Navarre, and various smaller duchies and counties. Therefore, many royal families appear and disappear in the French succession or become cadet branches upon marriage. A complete list of the senior-most line of Capetians is available below.

Capetian cadet branches 
The Capetian Dynasty has been broken many times into (sometimes rival) cadet branches. A cadet branch is a line of descent from another line than the senior-most. This list of cadet branches shows most of the Capetian cadet lines and designating their royal French progenitor, although some sub-branches are not shown.

 Hugh Capet
  Robert II of France
 Henry I of France
 Philip I of France
  Louis VI of France
 Louis VII of France
  Philip II of France
  Louis VIII of France
 Louis IX of France
 Philip III of France
 Philip IV of France
  House of Valois
   House of Évreux
   House of Bourbon
  House of Artois
   House of Anjou
  House of Dreux
   House of Courtenay
   House of Vermandois
   House of Burgundy

Descendants of Philip III of France 
 House of Valois (1293–1498)
 House of Valois-Orléans (1392–1515)
 House of Orléans-Angoulême (1407–1589)
 House of Valois-Anjou (1356–1481)
 House of Valois-Burgundy (1364–1477)
 House of Burgundy-Brabant (1404–1430)
 House of Burgundy-Nevers (1404–1491)
 House of Valois-Alençon (1325–1525)
 House of Évreux (1303–1400)
 House of Évreux-Navarre (1328–1425)

Descendants of Louis IX of France 

 House of Bourbon (1268–1503)
 House of Bourbon-Montpensier, counts (1443–1527)
  House of Bourbon-La Marche (1356–1438)
 House of Bourbon-Vendôme (became Royal House of France in 1589)
 House of Artois (1775–1883)
 House of Bourbon, Spanish branch (1700–present)
 Carlists (1819–1936)
 Alfonsines (1819–present)
 House of Bourbon-Anjou (1933–present)
  House of Bourbon, Spanish royal family (1933–present)
 House of Bourbon-Seville (1823–)
 House of Bourbon-Two Sicilies (1751–present)
 House of Bourbon-Braganza (1752–1979)
  House of Bourbon-Parma (1748–present)
  Parma-Luxembourg, called House of Nassau-Weilburg (1919–present)
 House of Orléans (1661–)
 Orléans-Nemours, then (1891) House of Orléans-Braganza (1864–present)
  Orléans-Alençon (1844–1970)
 Orléans-Aumale (1822–1872)
  Orléans-Montpensier, then House of Orléans-Galliera (1824–present)
 House of Bourbon-Condé (1557–1830)
 House of Bourbon-Conti (1629–1814)
  House of Bourbon-Soissons (1569–1641)
  House of Bourbon-Montpensier, dukes (1477–1608)
 House of Bourbon-Carency (1393–1520)
 House of Bourbon-Duisant (1457–1530)
  House of Bourbon-Preaux (1385–1429)

Descendants of Louis VIII of France 
 House of Artois (1237–1472)
 House of Anjou (initially ruling house of Sicily, then of Naples, became ruling house of Hungary) (1247–1382)
 House of Anjou-Naples (1309–1343)
 House of Anjou–Taranto (1294–1374)
 House of Anjou–Durazzo (1309–1414)

Descendants of Louis VI of France 
 House of Dreux (1137–1345)
 Breton House of Dreux (1213–1341)
 House of Montfort (1322–1488)
 Capetian House of Courtenay (1150–1727)
 Capetian House of Courtenay – Latin Emperors of Constantinople (1217–1283)

Descendants of Henry I of France 
 Capetian House of Vermandois (1085–1212)

Descendants of Robert II of France 
 House of Burgundy (1032–1361)
 Portuguese House of Burgundy (1109–1383)
 House of Aviz (1385–1580) – illegitimate male-line descent from Burgundy
 House of Braganza (1442–present) – illegitimate male-line descent from Aviz
 House of Cadaval (1645–present), the male line went extinct in 2001

Sovereigns from the Capetian dynasty

Latin Empire
 Peter (1216–1217)
 Robert (1219–1228)
 Baldwin II (1228–1273, exiled in 1261)
 Philip I (1273–1283)
 Catherine I (1283–1307)
 Catherine II (1307–1346)
 Robert II (1346–1364)
 Philip II (1364–1374)

Kingdom of Albania 
 Charles I (1272–1285)
 Charles II (1285–1294)
 Philip (1294–1331)
 Robert (1331–1332)
 John (1332–1336)
 Charles III (1336–1348)
 Joan I (1348–1368)
 Louis (1376–1383)

Kingdom of Etruria 
 Louis (1801–1803)
 Charles Louis (1803–1807)

Kingdom of France 
 Hugh (987–996)
 Robert II (996–1031)
 Henry I (1031–1060)
 Philip I (1060–1108)
 Louis VI (1108–1137)
 Louis VII (1137–1180)
 Philip II (1180–1223)
 Louis VIII (1223–1226)
 Louis IX (1226–1270)
 Philip III (1270–1285)
 Philip IV (1285–1314)
 Louis X (1314–1316)
 John I (1316)
 Philip V (1316–1322)
 Charles IV (1322–1328)
 Philip VI (1328–1350)
 John II (1350–1364)
 Charles V (1364–1380)
 Charles VI (1380–1422)
 Charles VII (1422–1461)
 Louis XI (1461–1483)
 Charles VIII (1483–1498)
 Louis XII (1498–1515)
 Francis I (1515–1547)
 Henry II (1547–1559)
 Francis II (1559–1560)
 Charles IX (1560–1574)
 Henry III (1574–1589)
 Henry IV (1589–1610)
 Louis XIII (1610–1643)
 Louis XIV (1643–1715)
 Louis XV (1715–1774)
 Louis XVI (1774–1792)
 Louis XVIII (1814–1815, 1815–1824)
 Charles X (1824–1830)
 Louis Philip (1830–1848)

Kingdom of Hungary 
 Charles I (1310–1342)
 Louis I (1342–1382)
 Mary (1382–1385, 1386–1395)
 Charles II (1385–1386)

Kingdom of Naples 
 Charles I (1266–1285)
 Charles II (1285–1309)
 Robert (1309–1343)
 Joan I (1343–1382)
 Charles III (1382–1386)
 Ladislas (1386–1414)
 Joan II (1414–1435)
 René I (1435–1442)
 Philip (1700–1707)
 Charles VII (1735–1759)
 Ferdinand IV (1759–1816)

Kingdom of Navarre 
 Philip I (1284–1305)
 Louis I (1305–1316)
 John I (1316–1316)
 Philip II (1316–1322)
 Charles I (1322–1328)
 Joan II (1328–1349)
 Philip III (1328–1343)
 Charles II (1349–1387)
 Charles III (1387–1425)
 Blanche I (1425–1441)
 Anthony (1555–1562)
 Henry III (1572–1610)
 Louis II (1610–1643)
 Louis III (1643–1715)
 Louis IV (1715–1774)
 Louis V (1774–1792)
 Louis VII (1814–1815, 1815–1824)
 Charles V (1824–1830)
 Louis Philip (1830–1848)

Kingdom of Poland 
 Louis (1370–1382)
 Hedwig (1384–1399)
 Henry (1573–1574)

Kingdom and County of Portugal  
 Henry (1093–1112)
 Alphonse I (1112–1185, crowned in 1139)
 Sancho I (1185–1211)
 Alphonse II (1211–1223)
 Sancho II (1223–1247)
 Alphonse III (1247–1279)
 Denis (1279–1325)
 Alphonse IV (1325–1357)
 Peter I (1357–1367)
 Ferdinand I (1367–1383)

Kingdom of Sicily 
 Charles I (1266–1282)
 Philip (1700–1713)
 Charles VII (1735–1759)
 Ferdinand III (1759–1816)

Kingdom of Spain 
 Philip V (1700–1724, 1724–1746)
 Louis I (1724)
 Ferdinand VI (1746–1759)
 Charles III (1759–1788)
 Charles IV (1788–1808, 1808)
 Ferdinand VII (1808, 1813–1833)
 Isabella II (1833–1868)
 Alphonse XII (1874–1885)
 Alphonse XIII (1886–1931)
 John Charles I (1975–2014)
 Philip VI (2014–)

Kingdom of the Two Sicilies 
 Ferdinand I (1816–1825)
 Francis I (1825–1830)
 Ferdinand II (1830–1859)
 Francis II (1859–1860)

Grand Duchy of Lithuania 
 Henry (1573–1574)

Grand Duchy of Luxembourg 
 Jean (1964–2000)
 Henri (2000–)

Duchy of Brabant 
 Anthony (1406–1415)
 John IV (1415–1427)
 Philip I (1427–1430)
 Philip II (1430–1467)
 Charles (1467–1477)
 Mary (1477–1482)

Duchy of Brittany 
 Peter I (1213–1237)
 John I (1237–1286)
 John II (1286–1305)
 Arthur II (1305–1316)
 John III (1312–1341)
 John IV (1341–1345)
 John V (1364–1399)
 John VI (1399–1442)
 Francis I (1442–1450)
 Peter II (1450–1457)
 Arthur III (1457–1458)
 Francis II (1458–1488)
 Anne (1488–1514)
 Claude (1514–1524)
 Francis III (1514–1524)
 Francis IV (1524–1536)
 Henry (1536–1547)

Duchy of Burgundy 
 Otto of Paris (956–965)
 Odo-Henry (965–1002)
 Henry I (1026–1032)
 Robert I (1032–1076)
 Hugh I (1076–1079)
 Odo I (1079–1103)
 Hugh II (1103–1143)
 Odo II (1143–1162)
 Hugh III (1162–1192)
 Odo III (1192–1218)
 Hugh IV (1218–1272)
 Robert II (1272–1306)
 Hugh V (1306–1315)
 Odo IV (1315–1349)
 Philip I (1349–1361)
 John I (1361–1363)
 Philip II (1363–1404)
 John II (1404–1419)
 Philip III (1419–1467)
 Charles (1467–1477)
 Mary (1477–1482)

Duchy of Lorraine 
 René I (1431–1453)
 John II (1453–1470)
 Nicholas I (1470–1473)
 Yolande (1473–1473)

Duchy of Lucca 
 Maria Louisa (1815–1824)
 Charles (1824–1847)

Duchy of Luxemburg 
 Anthony (1411–1415)
 Philip I (1443–1467)
 Charles (1467–1477)
 Mary (1477–1482)
 Philip V (1700–1712)

Duchy of Milan 
 Louis I (1499–1512)
 Francis II (1515–1521)
 Philip IV (1700–1714)

Duchy of Parma 
 Charles I (1731–1735)
 Philip (1748–1765)
 Ferdinand (1765–1802)
 Charles II (1847–1849)
 Charles III (1849–1854)
 Robert I (1854–1859)

Principality of Achaea 
 Charles I (1278–1285)
 Charles II (1285–1289)
 Philip I (1307–1313)
 Louis (1313–1316)
 Robert I (1318–1322)
 Robert II (1333–1364)
 Catherine II (1333–1346)
 Philip II (1364–1373)
 Joan I (1373–1381)
 Charles III (1383–1386)

Principality of Taranto 
 Charles I (1266–1285)
 Charles II (1285–1294)
 Philip I (1294–1331)
 Robert II (1331–1346, 1362–1364)
 Louis (1346–1362)
 Philip II (1362–1374)
 Ladislaus (1406–1414)
 James (1414–1420)

Marquisate of Namur 
 Philip II (1212–1226)
 Henry II (1226–1229)
 Margaret (1229–1237)
 Baldwin II (1237–1256)
 Philip IV (1421–1467)
 Charles I (1467–1477)
 Mary I (1477–1482)

Illegitimate descent

Empire of Brazil 
 Peter I (1822–1831)
 Peter II (1831–1889)

Kingdom of Portugal 
 John I (1385–1433)
 Edward (1433–1438)
 Alphonse V (1438–1481)
 John II (1481–1495)
 Manuel I (1495–1521)
 John III, (1521–1557)
 Sebastian, (1557–1578)
 Henry (1578–1580)
 Anthony (1580–1580, disputed)
 John IV (1640–1656)
 Alphonse VI (1656–1683)
 Peter II (1683–1706)
 John V (1706–1750)
 Joseph I (1750–1777)
 Peter III (1777–1786)
 Mary I (1777–1816)
 John VI (1816–1826)
 Peter IV (1826–1826)
 Mary II (1826–1828, 1834–1853)
 Michael I (1828–1834)

Senior Capets 
Throughout most of history, the Senior Capet and the King of France were synonymous terms. Only in the time before Hugh Capet took the crown for himself and after the reign of Charles X is there a distinction such that the senior Capet must be identified independently from succession to the French Crown. However, since primogeniture and the Salic law provided for the succession of the French throne for most of French history, here is a list of all the French kings from Hugh until Charles, and all the Legitimist pretenders thereafter. All dates are for seniority, not reign.

King of France:
 Hugh, King of France (987–996)
 Robert II, King of France (996–1031)
 Henry I, King of France (1031–1060)
 Philip I, King of France (1060–1108)
 Louis VI, King of France (1108–1137)
 Louis VII, King of France (1137–1180)
 Philip II, King of France (1180–1223)
 Louis VIII, King of France (1223–1226)
 Louis IX, King of France (1226–1270)
 Philip III, King of France (1271–1285)
 Philip IV, King of France (1285–1314)
 Louis X, King of France (1314–1316)
 John I, King of France (1316–1316)
 Philip V, King of France (1316–1322)
 Charles IV, King of France (1322–1328)
 Philip VI, King of France (1328–1350)
 John II, King of France (1350–1364)
 Charles V, King of France (1364–1380)
 Charles VI, King of France (1380–1422)
 Charles VII, King of France (1422–1461)
 Louis XI, King of France (1461–1483)
 Charles VIII, King of France (1483–1498)
 Louis XII, King of France (1498–1515)
 Francis I, King of France (1515–1547)
 Henry II, King of France (1547–1559)
 Francis II, King of France (1559–1560)
 Charles IX, King of France (1560–1574)
 Henry III, King of France (1574–1589)
 Henry IV, King of France (1589–1610)
 Louis XIII, King of France (1610–1643)
 Louis XIV, King of France (1643–1715)
 Louis XV, King of France (1715–1774)
 Louis XVI, King of France (1774–1793)
 Louis XVII, King of France (1793–1795)
 Louis XVIII, King of France (1795–1824)
 Charles X, King of France (1824–1836)

Legitimist Pretenders:
 Louis Anthony, Duke of Angoulême (1836–1844)
 Henry, Count of Chambord (1844–1883)
 John, Count of Montizón (1883–1887)
 Charles, Duke of Madrid (1887–1909)
 James, Duke of Anjou and Madrid (1909–1931)
 Alphonse Charles, Duke of San Jaime (1931–1936)
 Alphonse XIII, King of Spain (1936–1941)
 James Henry, Duke of Anjou and Segovia (1941–1975)
 Alphonse, Duke of Anjou and Cádiz (1975–1989)
 Louis Alphonse, Duke of Anjou (1989–)

The Capetian dynasty today 
Many years have passed since the Capetian monarchs ruled a large part of Europe; however, they still remain as kings, as well as other titles. Currently two Capetian monarchs still rule in Spain and Luxembourg. In addition, seven pretenders represent exiled dynastic monarchies in Brazil, France, Spain, Portugal, Parma and Two Sicilies. The current legitimate, senior family member is Louis-Alphonse de Bourbon, known by his supporters as Duke of Anjou, who also holds the Legitimist (Blancs d'Espagne) claim to the French throne. Overall, dozens of branches of the Capetian dynasty still exist throughout Europe.

Except for the House of Braganza (founded by an illegitimate son of King John I of Portugal, who was himself illegitimate), all current major Capetian branches are of the Bourbon cadet branch. Within the House of Bourbon, many of these lines are themselves well-defined cadet lines of the House.

Current Capetian rulers 
 Henri, Grand Duke of Luxembourg (since 2000)
Felipe VI, King of Spain (since 2014)

Current Capetian pretenders 
 Louis Alphonse, Duke of Anjou, Legitimist pretender to the Kingdom of France since 1989.
 Prince Pedro, Duke of Calabria, Calabrian pretender to the Kingdom of the Two Sicilies since 2015.
 Prince Carlo, Duke of Castro, Castroist pretender to the Kingdom of the Two Sicilies since 2008.
 Carlos, Duke of Parma, pretender to the Duchy of Parma since 2010 and one of the Carlist pretender to the Kingdom of Spain since 2010.
 Prince Sixtus Henry of Bourbon-Parma, the other Carlist pretenders to the Kingdom of Spain since 1979.
 Jean, Count of Paris, Orléanist pretender to the Kingdom of France since 2019.
 Prince Pedro Carlos of Orléans-Braganza, Petrópolis pretender to the Empire of Brazil since 2007.
 Prince Bertrand of Orléans-Braganza, Vassouras pretender to the Empire of Brazil since 2022.
 Duarte Pio, Duke of Braganza, pretender to the Kingdom of Portugal since 1976.
[] Balthazar Napoleon IV]] Raja of Bhopal of the Bourbon-Bhopal Dynasty
Philipe Count of Chalus of Bourbon Busset

Arms of cadet branches

See also 
French monarchs family tree
Genealogiae scriptoris Fusniacensis
Capetian Armorial

Notes

References

Works cited

Further reading 
Ingmar Krause: Konflikt und Ritual im Herrschaftsbereich der frühen Capetinger – Untersuchungen zur Darstellung und Funktion symbolischen Verhaltens. . Rhema-Verlag, Münster 2006, 
Fawtier, Robert. The Capetian Kings of France: Monarchy & Nation (987–1328). Macmillan, 1960. (translated from French edition of 1941)
Hallam, Elizabeth M. Capetian France 987–1328. Longman, 1980.
Le Hête, Thierry. Les Capetiens: Le Livre du Millenaire. Editions Christian, 1987.

External links 
 Genealogies of the Capetian dynasty from Genealogy.eu
 Capetian Kings: Chart of 148 Kings, France, Spain, England, etc, 500 yr timeline and wiki links

 
French royal families
European royal families
Spanish royalty
Roman Catholic families